Michael Cristopher "Cris" Reyes Mathay is a city councilor in the City of San Juan, Philippines.

Career
Cris comes from a political lineage, with his grandfather Mel Mathay an Assemblyman, Vice Governor of Metro Manila, and then Quezon City's Mayor, and his father Chuck Mathay as Congressman of Quezon City. Nevertheless, he  carved his own mark running in San Juan in the 2012 elections as councilor, where he finished the highest in Greenhills and Addition Hills, and finishing #2 overall in his district in San Juan.

His grandmother Sonya Mathay was the first barangay captain of Barangay Greenhills in the late 1970s, and Greenhills has since been Cris' and his own family's home.

He paid his dues as he worked his way up. Cris started as a Board Member of North Greenhills which is home to some of the Philippines' biggest politicians and businessmen including former Philippine President Joseph Estrada and Senator Franklin Drilon. He then became the President of this prestigious Homeowners Association.

In 2009, he ran and won as the barangay captain of Greenhills. In 2012, he became one of San Juan's youngest city councilors.

Personal life
An alumnus of Xavier School San Juan, he pursued further studies in the University of Nebraska.
Cris attained his degree in BS-Export Economics from the De La Salle–College of Saint Benilde in 2004.
He is married to Rikki Mathay  and they have two daughters, Cristah and Mischka. They are active volunteers of the Philippine Red Cross.

References

Living people
United Nationalist Alliance politicians
Year of birth missing (living people)
People from San Juan, Metro Manila
Metro Manila city and municipal councilors
De La Salle–College of Saint Benilde alumni